Adam Edward Ostolski (born 7 November 1978) is a Polish sociologist, columnist and activist. He is a member of the Krytyka Polityczna. In 2013-2016 he was co-leader of the Poland's Green Party.

He graduated from the Department of Philosophy and Sociology at the University of Warsaw. In 2011, he defended his doctoral dissertation Trauma and Public Memory: The Legacy of World War Two in Contemporary Poland. He lectures at the University of Warsaw and at the Medical University of Warsaw. His research interests include social movements, gendered nationalism, memory studies and sociology of knowledge. He is author of a major study comparing antisemitic and anti-gay discourses in contemporary Poland. He translated into Polish books by Immanuel Wallerstein, Étienne Balibar, Shmuel Eisenstadt and Judith Butler.

Ostolski was an environmental activist since the early 1990s. He is a member of the left-wing milieu Krytyka Polityczna since the establishment of the group in 2002. He is also a member of the Poland's Green Party, and in 2013-2016 its co-leader (first with Agnieszka Grzybek, then with Małgorzata Tracz). He left the party in February 2019.

In 2012, he wrote a column in the weekly Przekrój. Since 2013 he writes a political blog at neTemat.pl platform. He appeared in the film "What Is Democracy?" by Oliver Ressler (2009).

References

1978 births
Living people
The Greens (Poland) politicians
Polish opinion journalists
Polish sociologists
University of Warsaw alumni
Academic staff of the Medical University of Warsaw
Academic staff of the University of Warsaw
People from Barlinek